Metapanamomops is a monotypic genus of European dwarf spiders containing the single species, Metapanamomops kaestneri. It was first described by Alfred Frank Millidge in 1977, and has only been found in Germany and Ukraine.

See also
 List of Linyphiidae species (I–P)

References

Linyphiidae
Monotypic Araneomorphae genera
Spiders of Europe